Retshidisitswe Mlenga (born 27 February 2000) is a South African track and field sprinter who competes in the 100 metres and 200 metres. He holds a personal best of 10.37 seconds for the 100 m and 20.88 seconds for the 200 m. He was the gold medallist in the 200 m at the IAAF World U18 Championships in 2017.

Mlenga won the South African high school titles in the 100 and 200 m in 2016, then was runner-up in those events at the South African junior championships, setting new bests of 10.45 and 20.96 seconds, respectively. The following year he returned and won both titles at the South African junior meet, earning himself a place on the international team for the 2017 World U18 Championships in Athletics. He was among the favourites to win the 100 m event but was beaten by compatriot Tshenolo Lemao by 0.04 seconds. The pair again took the top two spots on the podium in the 200 m, with Mlenga winning to become the last world youth champion in the event (the championships was in its final iteration). His third and final medal of the tournament came in the mixed 4 × 400 metres relay where, alongside teammate Gontse Morake and 400 m hurdles champions Zeney van der Walt and Sokwakhana Zazini, he finished third in the rankings. Mlenga's performances helped South Africa to the top of the medal table, which was the nation's best ever performance at a global athletics championships.

Mlenga won the 2018 African Southern Region junior title in the 100 m, but was subsequently disqualified, having failed a drug test for the anabolic steroid Stanozolol at a meeting earlier in March that year. Mlenga received a four-year ban from the sport for the infraction.

International competitions

See also
List of doping cases in athletics

References

External links

2000 births
Living people
South African male sprinters
Doping cases in athletics
South African sportspeople in doping cases
World Youth Championships in Athletics winners
21st-century South African people